"Vdigam Level" is a single released by Bulgarian hip-hop duo Pavell & Venci Venc' from their debut album SeTaaBrat. It features vocals from Bulgarian-Russian singer Kristian Kostov. The song was released in Bulgaria as a digital download on 25 November 2016 through Virginia Records.

Music video
A music video to accompany the release of "Vdigam Level" was first released onto YouTube on 24 November 2016 at a total length of three minutes and forty-one seconds.

Track listing

Release history

References

2016 songs
2016 singles